The Tittabawassee River flows in a generally southeasterly direction through the Lower Peninsula of the U.S. state of Michigan. The river begins at Secord Lake in Clement Township, at the confluence of the East Branch and the Middle Branch. From there it flows through Gladwin, Midland and Saginaw counties where, as a major tributary of the Saginaw River, it flows into it at Saginaw. Its tributaries include the Chippewa, Pine, Molasses, Sugar, and Tobacco rivers.

Significant communities on or near the Tittabawassee River include Saginaw, Midland, and Sanford. At Edenville, the river was impounded by the hydroelectric Edenville Dam to create Wixom Lake. It was also impounded by a hydroelectric dam in Sanford to create Sanford Lake prior to the dam failures and resulting flooding on May 19, 2020. In Saginaw County, the river flows through Tittabawassee Township, which is named for the river and contains the unincorporated community of Freeland.

Floods 
On May 19, 2020, the Edenville Dam failed, followed by the Sanford Dam downstream being overtopped and a dike breaking at Poseyville, resulting in major flooding in Midland County. 10,000 people were evacuated including a seniors home and a few hospital patients. Two emergency shelters had to be relocated due to flooding and electrical power losses. Floodwater entered the Dow Chemical plant, forcing its shutdown and mixing with its containment ponds, leading to concern over pollution. The next day, water levels were predicted to reach 38 feet: four feet higher than the flood of 1986. National Guard units and a FEMA team were brought in to assist.

See also
 The Tridge

References

External links
 Map of real-time streamflow compared to historical streamflow for the day of the year (Michigan)
Michigan State University Wildlife Toxicology Lab Tittabawassee River Project
State of Michigan DEQ Midland/Tittabawassee River Dioxin Information Page

Rivers of Michigan
Rivers of Saginaw County, Michigan
Rivers of Ogemaw County, Michigan
Rivers of Gladwin County, Michigan
Rivers of Midland County, Michigan
Tributaries of Lake Huron